Santiago Maior may refer to the following places:

Cape Verde:
Santiago Maior (Santa Cruz), a parish of the municipality of Santa Cruz, Cape Verde
Portugal:
Santiago Maior (Alandroal), a parish in the municipality of Alandroal
Santiago Maior (Beja), a former parish in the municipality of Beja
Santiago Maior (Castelo de Vide), a parish in the municipality of Castelo de Vide